These are the official results of the 2018 Mediterranean Athletics U23 Championships which took place on 09–10 June 2018 in Jesolo, Italy.

Results

Men's 100 metres
Heats Wind: Heat 1: +1.4 m/s / Heat 2: +1.8 m/s

FinalWind: +1.1 m/s

Men's 200 metres
Heats Wind: Heat 1: +0.1 m/s / Heat 2: +0.6 m/s

FinalWind: +0.3 m/s

Men's 400 metres
Heats Wind: Heat 1: +3.0 m/s / Heat 2: +2.8 m/s

FinalWind: +1.7 m/s

Men's 800 metres 
Final

Men's 1500 metre 
Final

Men's 5000 metre 
Final

Men's 10000 metres 
Final

Men's 110 metres hurdles
Final

Men's 400 meters hurdles
Heats Wind: Heat 1: +3.0 m/s / Heat 2: +2.8 m/s

FinalWind: +1.7 m/s

Men's 3000 metres steeplechase
Final

Men's 10000 metre race walk
Final

Men's high jump
Final

Men's pole vault
Final

Men's long jump

Men's triple jump

Men's shot put

Men's hammer throw

Women's 100 meters
Heats Wind: Heat 1: +3.0 m/s / Heat 2: +2.8 m/s

FinalWind: +1.7 m/s

Women's 800 meters

Women's 1500 meters

Women's 5000 meters

Women's 10.000 metres

Women's 100 metres hurdles

Women's 400 metres hurdles

Women's pole vault

Women's long jump

Women's hammer throw

References

Events at the Mediterranean Athletics U23 Championships
Mediterranean